The 1996 NCAA conference realignment was initiated by the dissolution of the Southwest Conference (SWC), the formation of the Big 12 Conference and Conference USA (C-USA), and the expansion of the Western Athletic Conference to 16 teams. This "new" WAC ultimately did not last long, as eight of its 16 members left the conference in 1999 and founded the Mountain West Conference.

Background 
During the 1980s the SWC was plagued by 2/3 of its membership being on probation, at one time or another, for NCAA recruiting violations (only Arkansas, Baylor and Rice avoided NCAA sanctions).  The most notable involved the "Pony Express" scandals at SMU resulting in the football team receiving the death penalty in 1987. At that time, the NCAA prohibited a program on probation from appearing on live television.

Arkansas' departure from the SWC for the Southeastern Conference in 1990 left the conference with eight members all located in the state of Texas, and took away the one relatively strong sanction-free program (Baylor and Rice were also sanction-free but, both being small private schools, were among the conference's weakest athletic programs).  The combination of the number of programs on sanctions and the concentration of schools in only one state (plus the conference's weak on-field performance; its last eight conference champions failed to win their respective bowl games) ultimately led to the SWC's demise.

In 1994, Texas, Texas A&M, Baylor, and Texas Tech accepted invitations to join with the members of the Big Eight Conference to form the Big 12 Conference. For the 1996 season, SMU, TCU, and Rice accepted invitations to join the WAC. 

The C-USA was founded in 1995 by the merger of the Metro Conference and Great Midwest Conference, two Division I conferences that did not sponsor football at the time. The University of Houston left the Southwest Conference for the newly formed C-USA the year after.

Conference changes

Notes

WAC: In addition to the massive expansion of the league, two pre-expansion members, Air Force and Hawaiʻi, brought their women's sports into the conference. Air Force had previously housed its women's sports in the Division II Colorado Athletic Conference, while the Hawaiʻi women had been in the Big West.

See also
 2005 NCAA conference realignment
 2010–2014 NCAA conference realignment

NCAA conference realignments
College football controversies